Ronnie Jones (born 1931) is a former Canadian international lawn and indoor bowler.

Bowls career
Jones was born in Liverpool, England and emigrated to Canada as a teenager in 1952. He made his debut for Canada in 1974. 

He won a bronze medal in the pairs with Bill Boettger and a silver medal in the fours at the 1992 World Outdoor Bowls Championship in Worthing.

He also won a silver medal with Boettger in the pairs at the 1986 Commonwealth Games in Edinburgh.

He won two gold medals at the 1991 Asia Pacific Bowls Championships in the pairs and fours, in Kowloon, Hong Kong.

Family
His son is Kevin Jones.

References

1931 births
Living people
Canadian male bowls players
Commonwealth Games medallists in lawn bowls
Commonwealth Games silver medallists for Canada
Bowls players at the 1986 Commonwealth Games
Medallists at the 1986 Commonwealth Games